Sethu F.C. is an Indian women's professional football club based in Madurai, Tamil Nadu, that competes in the Indian Women's League. They lifted the league trophy in 2018–19.

Players

Honours

League
Indian Women's League
Champions (1): 2018–19
Runners-up (1): 2021–22
Tamil Nadu Women's League
Champions (2): 2019–20, 2021–22

References 

Football clubs in Tamil Nadu
Indian Women's League clubs
Women's football clubs in India
2016 establishments in Tamil Nadu
Association football clubs established in 2016